SOU "Kosta Susinov" - Radoviš, is a secondary school in  Radoviš, North Macedonia. The school educate students from grade 9 to grade 12, which counts for year 1 to year 4 (15–18 years of age students), and it is equivalent to a Freshman, Sophomore, Junior and Senior year of High school studies in some other parts of the world such as the United States. School usually begins in early September of each year and ends in early June. During the excess two and a half months, the students are given summer vacation to rest from the school year.

Programs 
Students enrolled in the school choose one of these programs:
Gymnasium
Metallurgy technician
Electro-technician for Computer Technics and Automatics

See also
 Education in North Macedonia
 Radoviš

External links 
 SOU "Kosta Susinov" website 

Education in North Macedonia